Kazimierz Marian Moskal (born 2 February 1962) is a Polish politician. He was elected to Sejm on 25 September 2005, getting 9541 votes in 23 Rzeszów district as a candidate from the Law and Justice list.

See also
Members of Polish Sejm 2005-2007

External links
Kazimierz Moskal - parliamentary page - includes declarations of interest, voting record, and transcripts of speeches.

1962 births
Living people
People from Dębica County
Law and Justice politicians
Members of the Polish Sejm 2005–2007
Members of the Polish Sejm 2007–2011
Members of the Polish Sejm 2011–2015
Members of the Polish Sejm 2015–2019
Members of the Polish Sejm 2019–2023
Polish schoolteachers